Helmet Peak is a monogenetic cinder cone of the Milbanke Sound Group in British Columbia, Canada. The basaltic tuff breccias on Lake Island and Lady Douglas Island originated from Helmet Peak on Lady Island.

See also
 Northern Cordilleran Volcanic Province
 List of volcanoes in Canada
 Volcanology of Canada
 Volcanology of Western Canada

References
 

Cinder cones of British Columbia
Holocene volcanoes
Monogenetic volcanoes
Range 3 Coast Land District